Sheila Frances Steafel (26 May 1935 – 23 August 2019) was a British actress, who was born in Johannesburg, but lived all her adult life in the United Kingdom.

Life and career
Steafel, who was born in Johannesburg, trained at the Webber Douglas Academy of Dramatic Art. She appeared in many television series, including The Frost Report, Z-Cars, Sykes, Dave Allen at Large, The Kenny Everett Television Show, Minder, The Ghosts of Motley Hall, Oh Brother! and The Laughter of a Fool. She was a regular in the BBC One music hall programme The Good Old Days, portraying her comic creation "Miss Popsy Wopsy", who invariably "played up" to chairman Leonard Sachs. She was also a regular on the "Tommy Cooper Hour".

In February 2018 she appeared in the daytime comedy drama Shakespeare & Hathaway: Private Investigators Episode 2 as care home resident Dora Bentley.

Her film appearances included Daleks' Invasion Earth 2150 A.D. (1966), Just like a Woman (1967), Quatermass and the Pit (1967), Baby Love (1968), Otley (1968), Goodbye, Mr. Chips (1969), The Smashing Bird I Used to Know (1969), Some Will, Some Won't (1970; co-starring her ex-husband's acting partner, Wilfrid Brambell), Tropic of Cancer (1970; as Tania), Percy (1971), Melody (1971), Digby, the Biggest Dog in the World (1973), All I Want Is You... and You... and You... (1974), Never Too Young to Rock (1975), Are You Being Served? (1977), What's Up Superdoc! (1978), Bloodbath at the House of Death (1984), Parting Shots (1999) and Back to the Secret Garden (2001).

Steafel also worked in BBC radio. In the 1970s and 1980s, she was a cast member on the weekly Radio 4 satirical show Week Ending, providing the voices of many characters and impersonating real-life figures, such as Margaret Thatcher. Steafel appeared as herself alongside Simon Jones in "The Lost Hitch-Hiker's Sketch", a sketch written by Douglas Adams for her 1982 Radio 4 show Steafel Plus.

In 1979 she starred in the West End stage production of A Day in Hollywood/A Night in the Ukraine in a number of roles, including that of Harpo Marx. In 2008, she was portrayed by Zoe Tapper in the BBC television play The Curse of Steptoe.

In 2015 she lent her voice to the character Master Matoya in the video game Final Fantasy XIV: Heavensward.

Published works
In 1998, Steafel released a CD album of Victorian songs entitled Victoria Plums (Redial/Polygram No. CD 557 209-2). In 2010, she released her autobiography When Harry Met Sheila. In 2012, Steafel published a collection of real life short stories under the title Bastards.

Personal life
Steafel was married to actor and comedian Harry H. Corbett from October 1958 until August 1964. She died of cancer.

Partial filmography

 Daleks' Invasion Earth 2150 A.D. (1966) - Young Woman
 Just like a Woman (1967) - Isolde
 Quatermass and the Pit (1967) - Journalist
 Monsieur Lecoq (1967)
 The Bliss of Mrs. Blossom (1968) - Pet shop saleslady
 Otley (1968) - Ground stewardess
 Baby Love (1969) - Tessa Pearson
 The Smashing Bird I Used to Know (1969) - Young Woman
 Goodbye, Mr. Chips (1969) - Tilly (uncredited)
 Tropic of Cancer (1970) - Tania
 Some Will, Some Won't (1970) - Sheila Wilcott
 Percy (1971) - Mrs. Gold
 Up Pompeii (1971) - Voluptua (voice, uncredited)
 Melody (1971) - Mrs Latimer
 To Catch a Spy (1971) - Woman in lift
 Digby, the Biggest Dog in the World (1973) - Control Operator
 All I Want Is You... and You... and You... (1975) - Wilma Brack
 Never Too Young to Rock (1976) - Cafe Proprietress
 The Ghosts of Motley Hall (TV, 1976-1978) - The White Lady
 Are You Being Served? (1977) - Hat Customer
 What's Up Superdoc! (1978) - Dr. Pitt
 The Quiz Kid (1979) - Brenda
 Bloodbath at the House of Death (1984) - Sheila Finch
 Parting Shots (1999) - President's Wife
 Back to the Secret Garden (2001) - Mrs. Chillblaine

References

External links

1935 births
2019 deaths
20th-century British actresses
21st-century British actresses
British autobiographers
British film actresses
British impressionists (entertainers)
British radio actresses
British stage actresses
British television actresses
People from Johannesburg
South African autobiographers
South African emigrants to the United Kingdom
South African film actresses
South African radio actresses
South African stage actresses
South African television actresses
White South African people
Women autobiographers